California's 27th State Senate district is one of 40 California State Senate districts. It is currently represented by Democrat Henry Stern of Malibu.

District profile 
The district straddles the Los Angeles–Ventura county border and encompasses most of Los Angeles's western suburbs. The district includes the Conejo Valley, parts of the San Fernando Valley, and a slice of the Santa Clarita Valley.

Los Angeles County – 6.3%
 Agoura Hills
 Calabasas
 Hidden Hills
 Los Angeles – 12.5%
Canoga Park
Chatsworth
Encino
Northridge – partial
Porter Ranch
Reseda
Tarzana
West Hills
Winnetka
Woodland Hills
 Malibu
 Santa Clarita – 19.8%
 Topanga
 Westlake Village

Ventura County – 38.7%
 Bell Canyon
 Casa Canejo
 Moorpark
 Oak Park
 Simi Valley
 Thousand Oaks

Election results from statewide races

List of senators 
Due to redistricting, the 27th district has been moved around different parts of the state. The current iteration resulted from the 2011 redistricting by the California Citizens Redistricting Commission.

Election results 1992 -present

2020

2016

2012

2008

2004

2000

1996

1992

See also 
 California State Senate
 California State Senate districts
 Districts in California

References

External links 
 27th State Senate District map — from the California Citizens Redistricting Commission.

27
Government of Los Angeles County, California
Government of Ventura County, California
San Fernando Valley
Conejo Valley
Simi Valley, California
Agoura Hills, California
Calabasas, California
Canoga Park, Los Angeles
Chatsworth, Los Angeles
Encino, Los Angeles
Hidden Hills, California
Los Angeles River
Malibu, California
Northridge, Los Angeles
Oak Park, California
Porter Ranch, Los Angeles
Reseda, Los Angeles
Tarzana, Los Angeles
Thousand Oaks, California
Topanga, California
West Hills, Los Angeles
Westlake Village, California
Winnetka, Los Angeles
Woodland Hills, Los Angeles
Santa Monica Mountains
Santa Susana Mountains
Simi Hills